J. D. Walsh may refer to:

J. D. Walsh (actor), American actor
J. D. Walsh (coach), American basketball coach

See also
Walsh (surname)